The Mag is a left tributary of the river Săliște in Romania. It flows into the Săliște near Săcel.

References

Rivers of Romania
Rivers of Sibiu County